Joseph Sun Yuanmo (November 7, 1920February 23, 2006) was a Chinese Catholic priest and Bishop of the Roman Catholic Diocese of Hongdong.

Biography
From the age of 15, Sun was educated in a lower spiritual seminary. He also studied philosophy and theology (including in Beijing). In 1948 he was ordained a priest, and worked as a pastor in Guangxi.

During the Cultural Revolution, he was required to work in the countryside. Later he was in the Roman Catholic Diocese of Hongdong (Shanxi province) as a parish priest, rector of the lower seminary, and spiritual director of nuns. In 1982 he was secretly consecrated by Bishop Francis Han Tingbi and became the auxiliary bishop of Hongdong. In 1991, he was the coadjutor of Bishop Francis Han Tingbi, and after Han death the same year, he took over the duties of the ordinary.

Sun died at the age of 85 after a long illness. He was recognized as a bishop by both the Vatican and the Chinese government.

References

External links
 GCatholic
 saintmichaelusa.org 

1920 births
People from Linfen
2006 deaths
20th-century Roman Catholic bishops in China
21st-century Roman Catholic bishops in China